María Beatriz del Rosario Arroyo y Pidal (María Rosario of the Visitation) (February 17, 1884 – June 14, 1957) was a Filipino nun and the founder of the Dominican Sisters of the Most Holy Rosary of the Philippines (Dominican Sisters of Molo).

Early life and education

Arroyo was born on Feb. 17, 1884, in Molo, Iloilo to a pious couple, Ignacio Arroyo and Doña María Pidal, as the only daughter of three children. Her two brothers were José María Arroyo and Mariano Arroyo. José became a senator in 1919, while Mariano was governor of Iloilo in 1928. She is a grand-aunt of former First Gentleman José Miguel "Mike" Tuason Arroyo, husband of Gloria Macapagal Arroyo, the fourteenth president of the Philippines, congresswoman of Pampanga and 21st House Speaker.  Mother Rosario's closest relative, niece Mariquita Arroyo Tuell Richmer (Daughter of Dr. Mariano Arroyo) died in 2014 in Indiana, USA. Mother Rosario is also the grand-aunt of Anne Walsh of Indiana, and Chris Tuell of Ohio, USA.

She was christened María Beatriz del Rosario at the Santa Ana Church in Molo on February 20, 1884, by Fr. Agapito Buenaflor. A noteworthy tradition of her family was almsgiving; Arroyo thus participated in the corporal works of mercy from an early age. Unspoilt by her affluent upbringing as a member of the aristocracy, she preferred a simple life and reportedly donated her inheritance to the congregation upon becoming an heiress.

Arroyo first attended classes at the Colegio de Santa Ana, a private school in Molo. In preparation for her first communion, she was transferred to Colegio de San José administered by the Daughters of Charity. She stayed at the Colegio until she finished her elementary education.

Career and death

The young María Beatriz joined the religious life in the Beaterio de Sta. Catalina in Manila and made her profession on January 3, 1914. She was taught at the Beaterio of Manila and in Lingayen. She then became a nun in the Dominican Order.

With the help of two other Dominican nuns, Arroyo would eventually create the Dominican Sisters of the Most Holy Rosary, a Filipino congregation, on February 18, 1927. Elected the First Superioress General of the Congregation at the Congregation's First General Chapter of January 3–6, 1953, she had 32 years of service.

Madre Sayong or Madre Maestra, as Arroyo was known, died on June 14, 1957.

Legacy
With a present membership of over 250, Arroyo's congregation runs multiple schools, colleges and retreat houses. Nationally, the order has professed sisters in the archdioceses of Capiz, Jaro, and Manila, as well as the dioceses of Bacolod, Imus, Mati, San José de Antique and Tagum.

The congregation also has an overseas presence in the Diocese of Chalan Kanoa in the Commonwealth of the Northern Mariana Islands; the Roman Catholic Diocese of Ngong in Kenya; at Convitto San Tommaso (Convitto Internazionale San Tommaso d'Aquino) in Rome; the Parish of San Quirico d'Orcia in Valdorcia, Tuscany in the Archdiocese of Siena-Colle di Val d'Elsa-Montalcino (Italy); and in the Archdiocese of San Francisco and the Diocese of Honolulu in the United States.

Canonization process 
Arroyo is currently in consideration for sainthood in the Roman Catholic Church with several miracles being investigated purportedly attributed to her.

On July 28, 2009, Archbishop Angel Lagdameo issued an edict declaring that he is initiating the “diocesan process for the Cause of the Canonization of the Servant of God Mother Rosario Arroyo de la Visitacion which was officially opened on the 7th day of October 2009 at the parish church of St. Anne, Molo, Iloilo City.”

It was spearheaded by the Congregation of the Dominican Sisters of the Most Holy Rosary of the Philippines (originally Beaterio de Molo) based in Molo, Iloilo. Mother Rosario founded this congregation in 1925. The Cause of Mother Rosario Arroyo was initiated by the Mother Rosario Arroyo Commission (MRAC) headed by former Superior General, Mother Visitacion Alecto, O.P. Later, Rev. Fr. Samson S. Silloriquez, OAR, was constituted as the Postulator who petitioned Archbishop Angel N. Lagdameo to decree the initiation of the Diocesan Process for Mother Rosario's beatification and canonization.

On June 11, 2019, the decree of heroic virtue was promulgated, giving her the title Venerable.

References

External links 
 Domican Sisters of the Most Holy Rosary of the Philippines
 New Saints website
 Mauro Bonato, Venerabile Maria Rosario della visitazione (Maria Beatrice Rosario Arroyo) 
 http://www.santiebeati.it/dettaglio/98549

20th-century Filipino Roman Catholic nuns
Leaders of Catholic female orders and societies
Hiligaynon people
Filipino people of Spanish descent
Maria Beatriz
1884 births
1957 deaths
People from Iloilo City
Filipino Servants of God
Visayan people
Venerated Catholics by Pope Francis